Jollj Ceramica was an Italian professional cycling team that existed from 1973 to 1977. Fausto Bertoglio won the general classification of the 1975 Giro d'Italia with team.

Major results

1974
Stage 5b Tour de Romandie, Knut Knudsen
Stage 5 Giro d'Italia, Pierino Gavazzi
Colbordolo Criterium, Giovanni Battaglin
Morrovalle Criterium, Giovanni Battaglin
Giro dell'Appennino, Giovanni Battaglin

1975
 Overall Giro d'Italia, Fausto Bertoglio
Stage 1, Knut Knudsen
Stages 3 & 13, Giovanni Battaglin
Stage 14, Fausto Bertoglio
 UCI Track Cycling World Championships (Individual Sprint), John Nicholson
Coppa Sabatini, Giovanni Battaglin
Colbordolo Criterium, Giovanni Battaglin
 Overall Volta a Catalunya, Fausto Bertoglio
 Sprint classification, Alessio Antonini
Stages 1b, 3 & 7a, Pierino Gavazzi
Stage 5, Giovanni Battaglin
Stage 7b, Fausto Bertoglio
Calvisano Criterium, Fausto Bertoglio

1976
Stage 1 Tour de Romandie, Knut Knudsen
Stage 18 Giro d'Italia, Simone Fraccaro
Stage 2 Tour de France, Giovanni Battaglin
Overall Cronostaffetta, Pierino Gavazzi, Simone Fraccaro, Giovanni Battaglin, Knut Knudsen
Stage 1b Cronostaffetta, Knut Knudsen
Stage 1c, Simone Fraccaro, Giovanni Battaglin
Coppa Placci, Fausto Bertoglio
 UCI Track Cycling World Championships (Individual Sprint), John Nicholson
Stage 4b Volta a Catalunya, Alfredo Chinetti
Stage 7a Volta a Catalunya, Fausto Bertoglio
Stage 7b Volta a Catalunya, Pierino Gavazzi

1977
Nord-West Schweizer Rundfahrt, Simone Fraccaro
Stage 4b Tour de Romandie, Knut Knudsen
Stage 3 Giro d'Italia, Simone Fraccaro
Stage 9 Giro d'Italia, Knut Knudsen
Stage 16b Giro d'Italia, Pierino Gavazzi
GP Montelupo, Giovanni Battaglin

References

External links

Cycling teams based in Italy
Defunct cycling teams based in Italy
1973 establishments in Italy
1977 disestablishments in Italy
Cycling teams established in 1973
Cycling teams disestablished in 1977